Casco is the surname of:

 Gladys Bernarda Casco (born 1954), Honduran politician
 Gonzalo Casco (1533–c.1588), Spanish military leader and conquistador in what is now Paraguay
 Horacio Casco (1886–?), Argentine fencer who competed in the 1924 Olympics
 Juan Casco (born 1945), Paraguayan retired footballer
 Milton Casco (born 1988), Argentine footballer
 Zelmar Casco (born 1926), Argentine fencer who competed in the 1964 Olympics

See also
 Cascos, another surname